Makarovka is a rural locality in Rusanovsky Selsoviet Rural Settlement, Fatezhsky District, Kursk Oblast, Russia. The population as of 2010 is 124.

Geography 
The village is located on the Usozha River (a left tributary of the Svapa in the basin of the Seym), 104 km from the Russia–Ukraine border, 43 km north-west of Kursk, 1 km south-east of the district center – the town Fatezh, 3 km from the selsoviet center – Basovka.

Climate
Makarovka has a warm-summer humid continental climate (Dfb in the Köppen climate classification).

Transport 
Makarovka is located 1.5 km from the federal route  Crimea Highway as part of the European route E105, 2 km from the road of regional importance  (Fatezh – Dmitriyev), 0.5 km from the road of intermunicipal significance  (38K-038 – Basovka), 30 km from the nearest railway station Vozy (railway line Oryol – Kursk).

The rural locality is situated 46 km from Kursk Vostochny Airport, 166 km from Belgorod International Airport and 232 km from Voronezh Peter the Great Airport.

References

Notes

Sources

Rural localities in Fatezhsky District